Dom or DOM may refer to:

People and fictional characters
 Dom (given name), including fictional characters
 Dom (surname)
 Dom La Nena (born 1989), stage name of Brazilian-born cellist, singer and songwriter Dominique Pinto
 Dom people, an ethnic group in the Middle East
 Domba or Dom, an ethnic group in India
 Doms, people of indigenous origin found in the Indian state of West Bengal

Arts and entertainment
 Dom (film), a 1958 Polish film
 DOM (album), a 2012 album by German singer Joachim Witt
 DOM (band), a band from Worcester, Massachusetts, US

Linguistics
 Differential object marking, a linguistic phenomenon
 Dom language, spoken in Papua New Guinea

Places
 Dom (mountain), Switzerland, the third highest mountain in the Alps
 Overseas department, (Département d'outre-mer), a department of France that is outside metropolitan France
 Dóm Square, a large town square in Szeged, Hungary
 Dominican Republic (ISO 3166-1 country code)
 Douglas–Charles Airport (IATA airport code), Dominica
 Dominion of Melchizedek, a micronation known largely for facilitating large scale banking fraud in many parts of the world

Buildings
 Dom Tower of Utrecht, a tower in Utrecht, the Netherlands
 Dom-Hotel, a five-star hotel in Cologne, Germany
 D.O.M. (restaurant), a restaurant in São Paulo, Brazil

Science and technology
 Digital optical monitoring, a function in a small form-factor pluggable transceiver
 2,5-Dimethoxy-4-methylamphetamine or DOM/STP, a psychedelic phenethylamine
 Dioctyl maleate, a chemical compound used in the manufacture of surfactants
 Directed ortho metalation, a chemical reaction mechanism
 Disk-on-a-module, an alternative to traditional computer hard disk drives
 Dissolved organic matter, a central nutrient in aquatic ecosystems
 Document Object Model, a cross-platform and language-independent application programming interface
 , the domain of a function

Other uses
 Dom (church), cognate with the Italian term duomo, meaning a collegiate church or cathedral
 Dom (title), a title of respect, derived from the Latin Dominus  
 Deo optimo maximo, abbreviated D.O.M., Latin for "to the Greatest and Best God", originally Jove, later the Christian God
 Dóm, Old English word meaning "judgment", "law"; see Anglo-Saxon law
 Days on market, how many days since a piece of real estate was listed for sale
 Drawn-over-mandrel, a class of manufactured tubing
 Dominant partner, in BDSM

See also
 Dom Dom (disambiguation)